is a Japanese video game designer, director, graphical artist, and composer. After previously working for several notable companies, he currently designs games from his own company Audio, Inc.

Career
Ueda was born in 1970 in Tokyo, Japan. He moved to Urayasu, Chiba at the age of 10. As a teenager, he took a part-time job at Tokyo Disney Resort, where he worked until 1988, when he attended Tokyo Design Academy. He was hired by Square in 1990.

At Square, Ueda worked mostly as a background and map designer, most prominently on Super Mario RPG. In 1995, he joined co-worker Kenichi Nishi and others in the establishment of the independent developer Love-de-Lic, where Ueda carried over his responsibilities from Square in the design of the company's first two releases. In 1999, Ueda left Love-de-Lic and joined Grasshopper Manufacture. He continued to design backgrounds and maps, but his debut as a director came with the two Shining Soul games released for the Game Boy Advance. He was also directed and acted as the main designer for Contact on the Nintendo DS.

Ueda left Grasshopper Manufacture in 2005 and founded Audio, Inc. the following January. The company currently consists of Ueda and 8 other individuals. So far, the company has made several Japan-exclusive releases on the DS, including its most recent game, Sakura Note: Ima ni Tsunagaru Mirai.

Works

References

External links
Audio, Inc. official site

1970 births
Japanese video game designers
Living people
People from Tokyo
Square Enix people
Video game composers